Rena Small (born 1954) is an American conceptual artist who works primarily in photography. Small is best known for her ongoing series The Artists' Hands Continuum, consisting of black and white photographs of the hands of well-known artists. She began the project in 1994.

Collections
George Eastman Museum 
J. Paul Getty Museum
Los Angeles County Museum of Art
Norton Simon Museum
Princeton University Art Museum 
RISD Museum
Seattle Art Museum

References

1954 births
20th-century American women artists
21st-century American women artists
20th-century American photographers
American conceptual artists
Living people